Agricultural Economics is the peer-reviewed academic journal of the International Association of Agricultural Economists, published 8 times per a year by Wiley-Blackwell.

External links 
 
 Agricultural Economics, National Library of Australia

Wiley-Blackwell academic journals
Agricultural journals
Economics journals
Bimonthly journals
English-language journals